The tubuli seminiferi recti (also known as the tubuli recti, tubulus rectus, or straight seminiferous tubules) are structures in the testicle connecting the convoluted region of the seminiferous tubules to the rete testis, although the tubuli recti have a different appearance distinguishing them from these two structures.

They enter the fibrous tissue of the mediastinum, and pass upward and backward, forming, in their ascent, a close network of anastomosing tubes which are merely channels in the fibrous stroma, lined by flattened epithelium, and having no proper walls; this constitutes the rete testis. Only Sertoli cells line the terminal ends of the seminiferous tubules (tubuli recti).

References 

Mammal male reproductive system